Capperia zelleri is a moth of the family Pterophoridae found on Sicily.

The wingspan is about 14 mm.

References

Oxyptilini
Endemic fauna of Italy
Moths described in 1951
Plume moths of Europe
Taxa named by Stanislaw Adamczewski